Events from the year 1757 in Russia

Incumbents
 Monarch – Elizabeth I

Events

  Imperial Academy of Arts

Births

Deaths

References

1757 in Russia
Years of the 18th century in the Russian Empire